John Howard Davis (February 6, 1917 – November 17, 1982) was an American outfielder in Negro league baseball. He played between 1940 and 1954.

References

External links
 and Seamheads

1917 births
1982 deaths
African-American baseball players
Baseball outfielders
Drummondville Cubs players
Fort Lauderdale Lions players
Houston Eagles players
Montgomery Rebels players
Navegantes del Magallanes players
American expatriate baseball players in Venezuela
Newark Eagles players
People from Ashland, Virginia
San Diego Padres (minor league) players
20th-century African-American sportspeople